At least two ships of the French Navy have borne the name Foch:

, a  launched in 1929 and scuttled in 1942
, a  launched in 1959 and sold to Brazil in 2000 as São Paulo. She was stricken in 2017

French Navy ship names